Aphelexis is a genus of flowering plants belonging to the family Asteraceae.

Its native range is Madagascar.

Species:

Aphelexis adhaerens 
Aphelexis candollei 
Aphelexis hypnoides 
Aphelexis selaginifolia

References

Asteraceae
Asteraceae genera